General Sir Walter King Venning  (17 January 1882 –  19 June 1964) was a British Army officer and administrator who served in both World Wars. Known for his excellency as an administrator, he served as Quartermaster-General to the Forces from 1939 to 1942 and Director General of the British Supply Mission in Washington, D.C. from 1942 to 1945.

Military career
Venning was educated at Allhallows and Clifton College, followed by the Royal Military College, Sandhurst. Venning was commissioned into the Duke of Cornwall's Light Infantry in 1901. He saw service with West African Frontier Force from 1907 to 1910.

He saw active service in the First World War, earning the Military Cross in the King's 1915 Birthday Honours. He was promoted to deputy assistant adjutant general at the General Headquarters of the British Expeditionary Force, and then to Assistant Adjutant General at the War Office.

After the war, Venning became an instructor at the Staff College and then in 1922 was promoted to assistant adjutant general at the War Office. He was appointed assistant adjutant and quartermaster general at Aldershot Command in 1927 and deputy adjutant and quartermaster general at Eastern Command in India in 1929. In 1931 he became commanding officer of the 2nd (Rawalpindi) Infantry Brigade in India, and then in 1934 returned to the British Army as director of movements and quartering at the War Office.

In the Second World War, Venning served as Quartermaster-General to the Forces from 2 February 1939 to 1942; in this capacity he had responsibility for the War Office Fleet, which he despatched to Dunkirk in 1940 to evacuate Allied forces. According to  The Times, "It was due to the superb organization which [Venning] created and directed that the mobilization of the Regular Army in 1939, the embodiment of the Territorial Army and the embarkation of the expeditibnary force were carried out with such astonishng smoothness."

He retired from the army at age 60 and as a civilian served as Director General of the British Supply Mission in Washington, D.C., from 1942 to 1945.

Namesake
Venning Barracks at MoD Donnington near Telford, Shropshire is named after him.

References

Bibliography

External links
Generals of World War II

 

|-

 

1882 births
1964 deaths
British Army generals of World War II
British Army personnel of World War I
Commanders of the Order of the British Empire
Companions of the Order of St Michael and St George
Duke of Cornwall's Light Infantry officers
Knights Grand Cross of the Order of the Bath
People educated at Allhallows College
Recipients of the Military Cross
Royal West African Frontier Force officers
Graduates of the Royal Military College, Sandhurst
War Office personnel in World War II
Academics of the Staff College, Camberley
Military personnel from London